Ashareh-ye Sofla (also Romanized as ‘Ashāreh-ye Soflá; also known as ‘Ashāreh-ye Pā’īn) is a village in Chah Salem Rural District, in the Central District of Omidiyeh County, Khuzestan Province, Iran. At the 2006 census, its population was 290, in 59 families.

References 

Populated places in Omidiyeh County